The Extraordinary Adventures of Mr. West in the Land of the Bolsheviks is a 1924 comedy film by Soviet director Lev Kuleshov. It is notable as the first Soviet film that explicitly challenges American stereotypes about Soviet Russia. The American characters are depicted sympathetically, and the film itself was a reflection of Kuleshov's general love for American cinema and culture.

Plot
A broad satire of American misconceptions of the Soviet Union, the film centers on the misadventures of the naive Harold Lloyd-esque John West (Porfiri Podobed), a YMCA president from the Cleveland suburb of Brecksville, Ohio. West is planning a trip to the newly founded USSR to spread the idea of the YMCA. However, his wife, Madge, is worried for him, especially after receiving popular American magazines from New York that depict Russia as being full of "savage" Bolsheviks who wear primitive rags and fur for clothing. For protection, West takes along his loyal cowboy sidekick Jeddy (Boris Barnet) on the trip.

However, on arriving in Moscow, his briefcase is stolen, he gets separated from Jeddy and he falls into the hands of a group of thieves, including a run-down countess (Aleksandra Khokhlova), who masquerade as counter-revolutionaries. The thieves play on West's fears and engineer his abduction by crooks dressed up as caricature Bolshevik "barbarians." The thieves then "rescue" West from the clutches of these fictional Bolsheviks, extorting thousands of dollars from him along the way.

In the end, it is the real Bolshevik police who rescue West. Meanwhile, Jeddy has hooked up with Ellie, an American girl residing in the Soviet capital. West then takes a sightseeing tour of NEP-era Moscow, where he sees that the Soviet government did not destroy all cultural landmarks, such as Moscow State University and the Bolshoi Theater, as the thieves suggested. The film culminates in Mr. West watching a military parade with the policeman and concluding that the American view of the Soviet Union is wrong. He telegraphs Madge, instructing her to hang a portrait of Lenin in his study.

Credited cast
 Porfiri Podobed - Mr. John West
 Boris Barnet - Cowboy Jeddy
 Aleksandra Khokhlova - The 'Countess'
 Vsevolod Pudovkin - Zhban
 Sergey Komarov - The One-Eyed Man
 Leonid Obolensky - The Dandy
 Vera Lopatina - Ellie, the American girl
 G. Kharlampiev - Senka Svishch
 Pyotr Galadzhev - Crook

Trivia
The Cathedral of Christ the Saviour in Moscow, which was later destroyed under Stalin in 1931, appears in the film.

References

External links
 
  (English subtitles)
 "Mr. West" Program Notes

1924 films
1924 comedy films
Soviet comedy films
Russian comedy films
Soviet propaganda films
Soviet silent feature films
Anti-Americanism
Films directed by Lev Kuleshov
Soviet Union–United States relations
Articles containing video clips
Soviet black-and-white films
Russian black-and-white films
Russian silent feature films
Films set in Moscow
Films set in Ohio
Silent comedy films